The 2008 Meretz leadership election was held on March 18, 2008. to elect the leader of the Meretz party.

Candidates

Ran
Ran Cohen, member of the Knesset since 1984 and former minister of industry and trade (1999–2000)
Zahava Gal-On, member of the Knesset since 1999
Chaim Oron, member of the Knesset (1988–2000 and again since 2003) and former minister of agriculture (1999–2000)

Withdrew
Yossi Beilin, incumbent party leader

Campaign
After Oron declared that he would run for party leader, incumbent party leader Yossi Beilin withdrew from the election.

Election system and conduct
The election was open to all members of the party. If no candidate had secured an outright majority of the vote in the initial round, a runoff election would have been held.

On the day of the election, Cohen filed a complaint with the party's election committee alleging irregularities at some polling stations. Gal-On demanded that three polling stations located in Deir al-Asad have their votes discounted, alleging that her campaign's representatives were blocked from overseeing the voting there and were physically assaulted.

Results
Around 75% of party members participated in the election. Oron won the outright majority required to forgo a runoff election, winning the party's leadership outright in the initial round of voting.

References

Meretz leadership
Meretz leadership elections
Meretz
Meretz leadership election